Campospinoso is a comune (municipality) in the Province of Pavia in the Italian region Lombardy, located about 50 km south of Milan and about 12 km southeast of Pavia.

Campospinoso borders the following municipalities: Albaredo Arnaboldi, Barbianello, Broni.

References

Cities and towns in Lombardy